Black palm is a common name for several species of plants in the family Arecaceae, including:

Astrocaryum standleyanum, native to Central and South America
Borassus flabellifer
Normanbya normanbyi (Queensland black palm)

Arecaceae